Eric Frattini (born 1963 in Lima) is a Spanish writer.

Works 
La Entrevista. El arte y la ciencia (1994) 
Tiburones de la Comunicación (1996) 
Guía Básica del Cómic (1998) 
Guía de las Organizaciones Internacionales (1998) 
Osama bin Laden, la espada de Alá (2002) 
Mafia S.A. 100 años de Cosa Nostra (2002) 
Irak, el Estado incierto (2003) 
Secretos Vaticanos (2003) 
La Santa Alianza, cinco siglos de espionaje vaticano (2004)  English translation as The Entity: Five Centuries of Secret Vatican Espionage. St. Martin's Press. 
ONU, historia de la corrupción (2005) 
CIA, Historia de la Compañía (2006) 
KGB, Historia del Centro (2006) 
MOSSAD, Historia del Instituto (2006) 
MI6, Historia de la Firma (2006) 
La Conjura, Matar a Lorenzo de' Medici (2006) 
Kidon, los verdugos de Israel (2006) 
El Polonio y otras maneras de matar. Así asesinan los servicios secretos (2007) 
El Quinto Mandamiento (2007) 
Los Espías del Papa (2008) 
CIA. Joyas de Familia (2008) 
El Laberinto de Agua (2009) 
Los Papas y el Sexo. De san Pedro a Benedicto XVI (2010) 
El Oro de Mefisto (2010) 
Mossad, los verdugos del Kidon (2011) 
Los cuervos del Vaticano. Benedicto XVI en la encrucijada (2012) 
La lenta agonía de los peces (2013) 
 Italia, sorvegliata speciale (2013) 
 La CIA en el Vaticano. De Juan Pablo II a Francisco (2014) 
 Muerte a la Carta. 50 últimas cenas de 50 grandes personajes de la historia (2014)  Prólogo de Juan Echanove
 ¿Murió Hitler en el búnker? (2015) 
 La CIA en el Vaticano. De Pius XII a Paul VI (2016) ISBN
 La isla del día siguiente. Crónica de una travesía por el Océano Pacífico (2016) ISBN 978-84-945766-5-2 Prólogo de Diego Fructuoso
 Manipulando la historia. Operaciones de Falsa Bandera. Del Maine  al Golpe de estado de Turquía. (2017) ISBN 978-84-9998-584-8 Prólogo de Pedro Baños 
 La Huida de las Ratas. Cómo escaparon de Europa los criminales de guerra nazis (2018) ISBN 978-84-9998-667-8
 Los Científicos de Hitler. Historia de la Ahnenerbe (2021) ISBN 978-84-670-6109-3 Prólogo de Diego Moldes
 Mossad el largo brazo de Israel (2021) ISBN 978-84-18151-42-2

External links 
 
 

Peruvian essayists
Peruvian novelists
Peruvian male writers
Spanish essayists
Spanish novelists
Spanish male novelists
1963 births
Living people
People from Lima
Spanish journalists
Male essayists